Operation Duryodhana 2 is a 2013 Telugu-language political film, produced by AB Srinivas on Neelanjana & Chinna Productions on banner and directed by Nandam Harishchandra Rao. Starring Jagapati Babu plays the lead role and music composed by M. M. Srilekha. This film is a sequel to the 2007 Telugu film Operation Duryodhana. In 2017, the film was dubbed into Hindi under the title Operation Duryodhana by Wide Angle Media Pvt Ltd.

Plot
The film begins with Chief Minister (CM) Y. S. Rajasekhara Reddy passing away in a helicopter crash. Later, an active controversy goes under the party to decide the next. Home Minister Venkatadri Naidu gets felicitations from his party men to gain power. Anyhow, the high command announces a dynamic youth Pratap Reddy as the candidate. Since Venkatadri Naidu is the most degenerate holds several scams. Though Venkatadri Naidu is begrudged forcibly accepts the status quo and halts for a shot to topple the government. Here, the CM makes revolutionary changes that rage Venkatadri Naidu's ego. Parallelly, Krishna is a Hawala broker who traffics illegal accounts of Venkatadri Naidu and is true-blue to him. He leads a delightful life with his wife & daughter whom he endears a lot. Once, Krishna's sidekick is seized for money laundering when several CBI officers are assassinated by Venakatadri Naidu. Subsequently, he intrigues and incriminates CM as regards. As soon as, a high political upheaval breaks out to dethrone the CM.

Currently, the wind turns with the arrival of CBI Officer Ashok. Krishna always contacts Venkatadri Naidu via public telephone to avoid tapping. At one time, after their talk, Krishna receives a call from Ashok who endangers him by keeping at point blank range to his rifle out of sight. Following this, Ashok creates jeopardizes weather on the spot by firing on behalf of Krishna. As a result, Police & Media land and surrounds him. Forthwith, Ashok demands to seek the true shade of venal politicians which he denies. Besides, Venkatadri Naidu ruses to slaughter Krishna & his family because he is terrified that Krishna may blow a whistle. Ashok safeguards the two which makes Krishna soul-search who states the iniquity of Venkatadri Naidu and the integrity of CM publicly. At last, wayward politicians are apprehended and CM gives his gratitude to Ashok. Finally, the movie ends with Ashok saluting the nation.

Cast
 Jagapati Babu as Ashok [C.B.I Officer]
 Posani Krishna Murali as Hawala broker Krishnakanth alias Pappu 
 Kota Srinivasa Rao as Home Minister Venkatadri
 Erasu Pratap Reddy as CM Pratap Reddy
 Rao Ramesh as Ramesh
 Babu Mohan
 Vijayachander
 Asha Saini
 Srilalitha

Soundtrack

References

External links

2013 films
2010s Telugu-language films
Indian sequel films